Lutjebroek is a village in the Netherlands. It is part of the municipality of Stede Broec. Lutjebroek has a population of just over 2000 people.

In colloquial Dutch, Lutjebroek has become synonymous with "any insignificant speck on the map". This is probably due to the comical sound of the name: the Dutch word luttel is akin to the English word "little" and broek is Dutch for "pants". However, broek as used in Lutjebroek and other Dutch geographical names means swamp. Lutjebroek takes its  name from the small swamp that existed nearby when the place was settled. The village is close to Grootebroek (Groote is Dutch for large).

Populated places in North Holland
Stede Broec